The Valdostan Alliance (AV) is a regionalist and progressive political party active in Aosta Valley, Italy.

The party was formed in 2019 by the merger of the Progressive Valdostan Union (UVP) and Autonomy Liberty Participation Ecology (ALPE).

In the 2020 regional election the party, in a joint list with Edelweiss (SA), obtained 8.9% of the vote and 4 seats: two for SA, one for UVP's Luigi Bertschy and one for ALPE's Albert Chatrian. After the election, the AV joined a regionalist/centre-left government led by Erik Lavévaz of the Valdostan Union (UV), comprising the UV, the Democratic Party (PD), Civic Network (RC), SA and Mouv'. Bertschy was appointed Vice President as well as minister of Economic Development, Formation and Labour, while SA's Carlo Marzi was minister of Finances, Innovation, Public Works and Land issues. AV and SA soon broke, with the former joining forces with United Aosta Valley, mainly comprising Mouv'. In 2023 AV joined a new government led by UV's Renzo Testolin, which, differently from Lavévaz's, comprised also For the Autonomy (PlA).

Leadership
Coordinator: Corrado Cometto (2019–2020), Albert Chatrian (2020–present)

References

External links
Official website

Political parties in Aosta Valley
Political parties established in 2017
2019 establishments in Italy
Social democratic parties in Italy